Ahmed Ibrahim Al-Mughassil ( born June 26, 1967), also spelled Ahmad Ibrahim Al-Mughassil,  is wanted by the United States government in connection with the June 25, 1996, attack on the Khobar Towers complex near Dhahran, Saudi Arabia.  He was indicted in the United States District Court for the Eastern District of Virginia and charged June 21, 2001, with 46½ separate criminal counts including murder for having driven the bomb truck that blew up Khobar Towers. 

Al-Mughassil is also known as Abu Omran and Arfad.  He has been identified as head of the military wing of the pro-Iran Saudi Hizballah, or Hizballah Al-Hijaz, meaning Party of God.  The group is one of a number of related Hizballah organizations operating in Saudi Arabia, Lebanon, Kuwait and Bahrain, among other places, and was outlawed in Saudi Arabia.

Personal Information

Khobar Towers plot, 1993–1996

The indictment traces the carefully organized 1996 bomb plot back to on or about 1993 when Al-Mughassil began to carefully review his cell members' surveillance reports of Americans in Saudi Arabia.

In the Fall of 1994, the cell determined Khobar Towers to be an important American military location and began an effort in the region to locate a storage site for explosives.

In 1995, an Iranian military officer directed the cell's surveillance on the Red Sea coast of Saudi Arabia for sites of possible future attacks against Americans, and the indictment alleges that Iranian officials enjoyed close ties and provided financial support to Al-Mughassil's party.

About June 1995, regular surveillance of Khobar Towers began, at the direction of Al-Mughassil. By late Fall 1995, Al-Mughassil had decided that Hizballah would attack Khobar Towers with a tanker truck loaded with explosives. In early 1996, Al-Mughassil began to hide explosives around the Khobar area.

In early June 1996, according to the indictment, a tanker truck was purchased by the conspirators, who then spent two weeks converting the truck into a truck bomb. The cell finalized plans on the evening of June 25, 1996, for the attack that night.

When the Datsun signaled that all was clear by blinking its lights, the bomb truck, driven by Al-Mughassil and with Ali Saed Bin Ali El-Hoorie as a passenger, entered the lot and backed up against a fence in front of building # 131. Al-Mughassil and El-Hoorie then exited the truck and entered the back seat of the Caprice for the getaway, driving away followed by the Datsun. In minutes, a massive explosion sheared the north face off of Building 131.  19 American servicemen were killed, and 372 were wounded.

Although rooftop sentries were immediately suspicious of the truck—parked some 80 feet from the building—and attempted an evacuation, few escaped. Comparable to 20,000 pounds of TNT, the bomb was estimated to be larger than the one that destroyed the federal building in Oklahoma City a year before, and more than twice as powerful as the 1983 bomb used at the Marine barracks in Beirut.

Fugitive trail

Immediately following the attack, the leaders fled the Khobar area and Saudi Arabia using fake passports.

In 2001, al-Mughassil was eventually indicted along with his co-conspirators for the 1996 Khobar Towers attack.  Still a U.S. fugitive months later, he then became one of four of the indicted men from the 1996 Khobar Towers attack who were named on the initial list of the FBI's top 22 Most Wanted Terrorists, which was released to the public by former President George W. Bush on October 10, 2001.

Al-Mughassil was believed to be living in Iran. 

On August 26, 2015, the Saudi-owned newspaper Asharq al-Awsat reported that al-Mughassil had been captured in Beirut and transferred to Riyadh, Saudi Arabia.

References

External links
 Rewards For Justice
 Al-Mughassil profile at FBI Most Wanted Terrorists Site

1967 births
Living people
People from Qatif
Saudi Arabian rebels
Saudi Arabian mass murderers
Saudi Arabian Shia Muslims
FBI Most Wanted Terrorists
Fugitives wanted by the United States
Individuals designated as terrorists by the United States government